Sana Dalawa ang Puso (Lit: Wish There Were Two Hearts / English: Two Hearts) is a 2018 Philippine romantic drama television series starring Jodi Sta. Maria in a dual role with Richard Yap and Robin Padilla. The series premiered on ABS-CBN's PrimeTanghali noontime block and worldwide on The Filipino Channel on January 29, 2018, replacing Ikaw Lang ang Iibigin.

The series will mark the Sta. Maria-Yap reunion on television five years after the long-running pre-noontime drama Be Careful With My Heart.

Series overview

Episodes

Season 1 (2018)

References

Lists of Philippine drama television series episodes